Baseball in the Netherlands started in , having been introduced to the country by English teacher J.C.G Grasé of Amsterdam, following a holiday to America. The national governing body for baseball is the Royal Netherlands Baseball and Softball Federation.

The Netherlands National Baseball Team is consistently ranked in the top ten of the WBSC World Rankings and has won the European Baseball Championship twenty times. Although baseball is a minority sport within the Netherlands, it is the main sport of the Dutch overseas territories in the Caribbean (the former Netherlands Antilles).

History

1911 - 1940
The driving force in the early days of Dutch baseball was J.C.G. Grasé of Amsterdam. After discovering baseball while on vacation in the United States, he introduced the game in the Netherlands in 1911. An English teacher by profession, Grasé was able to translate the rules of the game into Dutch. The first official games were played in 1911 and on March 12, 1912, Grasé founded the Dutch Baseball Union. Grasé was also the founder of the oldest baseball club in Europe, Quick Amsterdam (founded 1 March 1913).

The first official competition was played in 1922. The major league was formed out of four clubs that year: Ajax (a branch of the famous football club), Blue White (also a football club), Hercules and Quick Amsterdam. Quick Amsterdam became the first Dutch champion.
During the early years, baseball was only played in Amsterdam, but quickly spread to Haarlem as well. These two cities dominated Dutch baseball until 1963.

In 1925, a ship of the US Navy visited Amsterdam. Players of Blue White heard of the visit and invited the sailors to a game of baseball. After one inning, the Americans led 14-0. After two hours of play, the final score was 27-2.

In the early days, the pitcher was the one who could throw the fastest ball. At the time, it was considered unsportsmanlike to bunt or to take advantage of the lack of control by a pitcher and it was considered a humiliation to get a base on balls. It was far better to hit a fly out than to reach first base on four balls. Furthermore, the sport was played wearing shorts.

At the end of the 1937 season, EDO from Haarlem and Blue White from Amsterdam played each other to determine the Dutch champion. The game was played with a two-hour time limit. The coach of EDO thought that he had won the game after the final out of an inning, but according to the umpire, there were three more minutes to be played, so a new inning began. The players of EDO were furious and Blue White ended up winning and became Dutch champion. This was the final instance of a two-hour time limit, and beginning in 1938, games in the major league lasted nine innings.

In 1939, a team of Mormon missionaries from Salt Lake City played in the Dutch league under the name Seagulls. They only lost two games (vs. Blue White from Amsterdam 7-1, and vs. HHC from Haarlem 6-2).

1940 - 1970

After the German invasion in May 1940, baseball went through a difficult period. As the war continued, baseball materials became scarce. Starting in 1943, baseballs were made of rubber-like substance with a cork center. The balls, which were made by the tire company Vredenstein, could absorb little more than a couple of hits, before breaking apart. Some pitchers would cut out a small piece in order to throw a curveball, because the balls didn't have seams. Clubs were forced to mend cracked bats with screws or whatever other materials were handy.

After World War II, the Americans helped Europe rebuild with the Marshall Plan. They also sent baseball materials to the Netherlands including uniforms, bats, balls, etc. Teams like OVVO from Amsterdam and HHC from Haarlem played in red uniforms.

Many games were played against military teams. In their own league, the Dutch could hold their own, but not against the better skilled Americans. Han Urbanus, was the best Dutch pitcher in these days. Getting a hit against him guaranteed a starting spot in the Dutch national team. A Dutch American journalist, Albert Balink, managed two trips to spring training camp for Han Urbanus. The journalist knew that the Dutchman would need a lot more experience to improve. Martin Jole, one of the players who could hit Hans Urbanus, went to a spring training camp with the Cincinnati Reds. He showed Dutch players how swinging a bat day after day could improve their hitting.

Albert Balink also introduced medals for the best players and hitters, which allowed him to show that baseball is a sport of stats. In 1953, Han Urbanus got a phone call from the USA. The New York Giants had offered him a minor league contract. He refused, due to the fact that he preferred to teach his fellow countrymen what he had learned in the USA.

From 1949 to 1953, Dutch baseball was dominated by OVVO from Amsterdam, which claimed five consecutive national titles. In 1955, the club won it for the last time, and would never win another championship again.

The post-war help of the Americans helped the Dutch earn their first European title in 1956 in Rome, Italy. Han Urbanus was a defensive force and the Dutch batters performed very well. Because of the European title, the Dutch were allowed to go to the Global World Series. American coaches like Ron Fraser and Bill Arce helped the Dutch to improve their game. The number of baseball fields built around the country increased dramatically.

In 1963, a real baseball stadium was built in Haarlem. This stadium would be the base of the Haarlem Baseball Week, a yearly event.

Prior to 1963, baseball was dominated by teams from Amsterdam and Haarlem. But in 1963, Sparta from Rotterdam became the Dutch champion. From 1963 to 1974, Sparta clinched nine national titles, a record not exceeded until 1985 by the Haarlem Nicols. In the early sixties, each team played 14 games; one game every weekend.

1970 – present

In 1970, a Dutch-born pitcher named Bert Blyleven made the Minnesota Twins roster. He had a very successful Major League career which lasted until 1992, and was elected to the Baseball Hall of Fame in 2010.  He was, however, raised in California and never played in the Dutch league.  The first Dutch Major League Baseball player who actually grew up and learned the game in the Netherlands was Win Remmerswaal, who pitched briefly for the Boston Red Sox in 1979 and 1980.

Dutch baseball was dominated by Sparta from Rotterdam in the early 70s. The "magnificent three" from the Dutch Antilles were unstoppable: Hudson John, Simon Arrindell and Hamilton Richardson, who all had a big influence on Sparta, but by 1974, the era was over.

At the end of the 1972 season, the football club Ajax decided to cut loose the baseball branch, ending the ball club.

At the end of the 1977 season, there was some turmoil at OVVO from Amsterdam. This baseball club was also a branch of a football club. The football club, an amateur side, decided to turn professional and begin paying players. The baseball branch did not agree, and big names, like Han Urbanus, decided to leave and founded a new club: Amstel Tigers. Other players like Charles Urbanus Jr. (pitcher/shortstop), Jan Hijzelendoorn (pitcher), Paul Smit (catcher) and Don Wedman decided to follow suit, along with almost the entire team. The Dutch Baseball Federation tried to mediate, but the players did not come back. The city of Amsterdam appointed a terrain in the Western part of the city. The Amstel Tigers thought that field would be too far away, but ultimately the new club built a baseball field there, which is now used by Quick Amsterdam.

In the meantime, OVVO would not be persuaded to take a step back to a lower division. The Amstel Tigers started their first season in the overgangsklasse; a league one level lower than the hoofdklasse. With such strong players, the Tigers were quickly promoted to the top division in 1979. OVVO's 1978 season was a disaster and the team was relegated. The Amstel Tigers went on to become champions in 1979, 1980, and 1986.

In 1979, a Dutch pitcher made his MLB debut on the mound in Milwaukee. The Red Sox were trailing 4-1, as they called pitcher Win Remmerswaal. His debut was a good one, even though his team lost 5-3. After the game, journalists seemed fascinated that a Dutch player could have come so far in the game. The MLB career of Win Remmerswaal only lasted two seasons, due to injuries. After the 1980 season, Remmerswaal had pitched in 22 games (3 victories and 1 loss). His short career among baseball's elite lasted 55 innings. After his Major League career, Remmerswaal went to Italy, and played on several teams for many years.

The eighties and nineties were bad decades for many baseball clubs. In 1986, Charles Urbanus, Jr. decided that it would be his last season. This was a huge blow for his club, the Amstel Tigers. Urbanus was a magnet for players, who considered it an honour to play with him. But an Amstel Tigers without him was not as attractive to new talent and the club lost competitiveness. Eventually, the members voted for a merger with HCAW from Bussum, a club that was playing the lower league. The new club, HCAW Tigers, were promoted to the major league in 1989 and would go on to win the title in 1996 and 1998, albeit without any of the old Amstel Tigers players. Haarlem Nicols were particularly dominant in the 1980s with seven pennants over ten years, but declared bankruptcy in 1994, just five years after winning their last pennant.

In 1981, Neptunus Rotterdam won the pennant for the first time since the baseball team's foundation in 1942. Neptunus began to dominate the championship during the 1990s and 2000s, winning eleven pennants in total including seven consecutively between 1999 and 2005.

World Baseball Classic

2006
In 2006, the Netherlands finished 3rd in Pool C behind Puerto Rico and Cuba.

2009
In 2009, the Netherlands defeated the heavily favored Dominican Republic twice to qualify for the second round of the World Baseball Classic. The Dutch upset the Dominican team 3-2 in their first meeting and 2-1 in 11 innings in a qualification game.

2013
In 2013, the Netherlands finished 2nd in Pool B with wins over South Korea and Australia. In the second round the Netherlands were placed in Pool 1. The Dutch beat Cuba twice while losing to Japan twice to finish as the second seed. In the semifinals they fell to the Dominican Republic 4-1.

2017
The Netherlands again lost in the semifinals, this time to Puerto Rico. They reached there by going 2-1 both in the first and second rounds.

Baseball World Cup (IBAF)

2009
In 2009, for the first time in history, the Baseball World Cup was hosted by a continent rather than a single country. The Netherlands were one of 8 European countries to host the tournament. Together with Italy, they hosted the second round, which is the reason they received a bye through the first round. In the second round they faced the teams from Cuba, Puerto Rico, Venezuela, South Korea, Nicaragua, Spain and Great Britain. They went undefeated through the first six games, but lost the final game to Cuba, 3-5.

They went into the third round as the top seed, where they faced the teams from the United States, Canada, Australia and Chinese Taipei. In the first game, they defeated Chinese Taipei 11-2 but they lost their 3 remaining games.

Before the final round, every team was ranked based on their results of the second and third round. As a result, the Netherlands played Australia in their final game of the tournament where the fifth and sixth position was determined. They lost this game 1-4 and finished the tournament in sixth place with a record of 7 wins and 5 losses. Catcher Sidney de Jong was selected for the tournaments All Star Team.

2011
In 2011, in the 39th and final World Baseball cup, the Netherlands defeated the "baseball powerhouse" Cuba, and became world champion for the first time in history. 

In the first round, they played the teams from Canada, Panama, the United states, Puerto Rico, Japan, Chinese Taipei and Greece. They only lost to Canada, 4-5 in extra innings, but they were able to win all of the other 6 games, including a 19-0 shutout over Greece. Tied for the first seed, they played South Korea, Australia, Cuba and Venezuela in the second round. They won all 4 games, including an outstanding performance against Venezuela, who they defeated 12-2 in 7 innings.

In the championship game, they played 25-time champion Cuba. Their manager, Brian Farley, led them to a 2-1 victory. Curt Smith scored for the Dutch team and received MVP honors, while Tom Stuifbergen was declared best pitcher of the tournament.

See also
 Haarlem Baseball Week
 Holland Series
 World Port Tournament
Baseball teams in the Netherlands
Baseball awards#Netherlands

References

External links
History 
de Nederlandse honkbalsite (Dutch)
KNBSB (Royal Netherlands Baseball and Softball Federation) (Dutch)
Dutch Baseball and Softball Museum website. Retrieved 2010-11-12.
Forum: History of Dutch baseball (a messageboard thread with a fairly complete history). Baseball Fever (part of Baseball-Almanac)
Connor, Joe. Welcome to the Netherlands. ESPN (MLB), January 17, 2006. Retrieved 2009-12-16.
Remington, Alex. Honkbal! Netherlands Bids to Host MLB in 2014. FanGraphs. September 1, 2011. Retrieved 2011-09-03.
Rodney Daal Signs Pro Contract with San Diego Padres Organization. August 24, 2010. Mister Baseball: All about Baseball & Softball in Europe

 
Articles containing video clips